Mihaela Buzărnescu and Raluca Olaru were the defending champions, but Buzărnescu chose not to participate this year. Olaru played alongside Darija Jurak, but lost in the semifinals to Daria Gavrilova and Ellen Perez.

Gavrilova and Perez went on to win the title, defeating Duan Yingying and Han Xinyun in the final, 6–4, 6–3.

Seeds

Draw

Draw

References

External Links 
Main Draw

2019 WTA Tour
2019 Doubles
2019 in French tennis